, was an auxiliary vessel operated by the Imperial Japanese Navy, serving from the 1910s through World War II. Her classification changed numerous times during her operational life. Although officially designated as a submarine tender for most of her career, Komahashi very rarely functioned in this role, but was used instead as an oceanographic survey vessel throughout the Pacific, and as a kaibokan escort vessel for convoys of merchant ships during the Pacific War.

Background
The Imperial Japanese Navy received its first submarines during the Russo-Japanese War, but these vessels were not operational until after the war ended. During the post-war period, submarine warfare was given a low priority for development, as the early submarines were regarded as unsafe, and useful only for short-range coastal point defense.

Design
She was laid down on 7 October 1912 and was launched on 21 May 1913. She was specifically intended for the role of supplying the Imperial Japanese Navy's Mako Guard District, located in the Pescadores between Taiwan and China.
Her design was that of a standard three island merchant freighter, with two coal-fired Hayabara boilers producing 1825 shp, driving a single shaft, with a design speed of 14 knots. In 1932, she was modernized with two Ikegai diesel engines. She was armed with two QF 12-pounder 12 cwt naval guns and one 8 cm/40 3rd Year Type naval gun.

Operational career 
With the start of World War I, from 20 January 1914, Komahashi was based at Sasebo Naval District, and was converted into a submarine tender on 23 May 1914. However, soon after, on 16 August 1914, she was re-classified as a 2nd class kaibokan and assigned to the 4th Torpedo Division.
 
Although on 1 December 1924 she was classified once again as a submarine tender, her primary task for the next several years was that of a survey vessel, charting the area around the Pescadores and the China coast. On 1 October 1931, Komahashi was assigned to the Yokosuka Naval District, and was refitted at the Yokosuka Naval Arsenal in early 1932 with more powerful diesel engines and survey ship facilities, a process that lasted until November 1932. Upon re-launching, she surveyed around the Luzon Strait, the South Pacific Mandate, the Kuril Islands and the Kamchatka Peninsula, collecting data on ocean currents, salinity, subsea topography and fisheries resources. One of her discoveries was the Komahashi Seamount, an underwater volcano at the northern end of the Kyushu–Palau Ridge in the Philippine Sea.

On 19 August 1937, Komahashi was assigned to the IJN 3rd Fleet and participated in combat operations along the China coast during the Second Sino-Japanese War. On 10 October 1937, she was assigned to the China Area Fleet.

From June 1939, Komahashi was once again assigned to the Yokosuka Naval District, and assigned to surveying missions and patrols of the South Pacific Mandate area for the potential development of seaplane bases and naval harbors, and was serving in this capacity at the time of the attack on Pearl Harbor on 7 December 1941.  At some time during 1941, she was also fitted with depth charge racks and six Type 96 25-mm AA guns.

During early 1942, Komahashi remained based at Yokosuka, and provided short-range escort for inbound and outbound convoys. On 7 July 1942, Komahashi participated in the rescue mission for survivors of the SS Haruna Maru, a 10420-ton passenger liner that had run aground off Omaezaki on a transport mission for the Imperial Japanese Army. After the conclusion of the rescue, Komahashi was reassigned to the IJN 5th Fleet for operations in northern waters. During August–September 1942 Komahashi surveyed the Aleutian Islands during the Japanese invasion. She was heavily damaged by U.S. aircraft at Kiska on 29 September and was forced to withdraw to Yokosuka Naval Arsenal for repairs. On 1 November, she was once again assigned to the Yokosuka Naval District, where she made 38 runs as a convoy escort and transport in waters around the Japanese home islands throughout 1943.

On 16 January 1944, Komahashi was declared flagship of the 3rd Escort Group, IJN Escort Fleet and based in Owase, Mie Prefecture, escorting shipping around the Kii Peninsula. Later that year, she received more anti-aircraft guns, including additional Type 96s, two Type 93 13.2 mm AA guns and two Type 92 7.7mm machine guns.

On 15 April 1945 Komahashi was assigned to the role of flagship of the 4th Special Attack Division, based at Owase. The division included 60 Shin'yō  suicide motorboats, 24 Kairyu midget submarines and four Kaiten human torpedoes.

It was in this role that she was attacked by Allied aircraft of Task Force 38 on 27 July of that year and sank in shallow waters at Owase. Komahashi was abandoned until the surrender of Japan and officially struck from the Navy Directory on 30 November 1945. On 20 September 1948, she was refloated and towed to Nagoya, where she was salvaged for scrap in 1949.

Notes

References
 
 
 
 Ships of the World special issue Vol.47, Auxiliary Vessels of the Imperial Japanese Navy, (Japan), March 1997
 The Maru Special, Japanese Naval Vessels No.29, Japanese submarine tenders w/ auxiliary submarine tenders,  (Japan), July 1979
 The Maru Special, Japanese Naval Vessels No.135, Japanese submarines IV, Ushio Shobō (Japan), May 1988
 Shinshichirō Komamiya, The Wartime Convoy Histories, (Japan), October 1987,

External links
 

World War II naval ships of Japan
Ships built by Sasebo Naval Arsenal
1913 ships
Submarine tenders of the Imperial Japanese Navy
Ships sunk by US aircraft
World War II shipwrecks in the Philippine Sea